Osmaston is a rural locality in the local government area of Meander Valley in the Launceston region of Tasmania. The 2016 census determined a population of 88 for the state suburb of Osmaston.

History
Osmaston was gazetted as a locality in 1968.

Geography
Quamby Brook (the watercourse) forms the north-western, northern, and north-eastern boundaries.

Road infrastructure
The C501 route (Osmaston Road) passes through from east to west. The C502 route (Exton Road / Bogan Road) passes through the north-west corner from north to south, where it intersects with C501.

References

Localities of Meander Valley Council
Towns in Tasmania